AIID may refer to:
 Autoimmune disease
 Acyl-homoserine-lactone acylase, an enzyme